Tommy Tremble (born June 2, 2000) is an American football tight end for the Carolina Panthers of the National Football League (NFL). He played college football at Notre Dame and was drafted by the Panthers in the third round of the 2021 NFL Draft.

Early life and college career
Tremble attended Wesleyan School in Peachtree Corners, Georgia. He committed to the University of Notre Dame to play college football in 2018. After not playing in any games his true freshman year, Tremble played in all 13 in 2019, recording 16 receptions for 183 yards and four touchdowns. In 2020, he had 19 receptions for 218 yards. After the season he declared for the 2021 NFL Draft.

Statistics

Professional career

Tremble was selected by the Carolina Panthers in the third round with the 83rd overall pick in the 2021 NFL Draft. Tremble signed his four-year rookie contract with Carolina on July 22, 2021.

NFL career statistics

Personal life
His father, Greg Tremble, played in the NFL and was a member of the Dallas Cowboys who won Super Bowl XXX.

References

External links
Carolina Panthers bio
Notre Dame Fighting Irish bio

2000 births
Living people
People from Peachtree Corners, Georgia
Players of American football from Georgia (U.S. state)
Sportspeople from Fulton County, Georgia
American football tight ends
Notre Dame Fighting Irish football players
Carolina Panthers players